The 1990–91 SM-liiga season was the 16th season of the SM-liiga, the top level of ice hockey in Finland. 12 teams participated in the league, and TPS Turku won the championship.

Standings

Playoffs

Quarterfinals
 JyP HT - Tappara Tampere 2:1 (7:2, 3:4, 3:2)
 HPK - HIFK 2:1 (2:4, 4:3, 8:3)

Semifinals
 TPS - HPK 3:1 (8:0, 3:4, 3:0, 3:1)
 KalPa - JyP HT 3:0 (2:1, 4:3, 3:2)

3rd place
 HPK - JyP HT 6:3

Final
 TPS - KalPa 4:1 (5:1, 4:3, 4:3, 2:6, 7:2)

External links
 SM-liiga official website

1990–91 in Finnish ice hockey
Fin
Liiga seasons